Limkheda is a village in Dahod district, Gujarat, India.

Geography
Limkheda is famous for its hotel chandra vilasha  kachori, Limkheda has very good old Hasteshwar mahadev temple, it is good place for picnic, in Limkheda deshi bazaar is known as HAT, its arranged every Sunday.

Location 
Nearest airport is Harni Airport at Vadodara.

National Highway 59 passes through Limkheda.

References

External links
 Satellite map of Limkheda

Villages in Dahod district